The Roland SP-555 is a discontinued music sampler manufactured by Roland Corporation. The 555 is part of the SP family, which includes Boss’s popular SP-303 and Roland's SP-404 installments. The sampler was released in 2008.

Features

The SP-555 has a microphone input that accepts 1/4 inch phone type, XLR type, and Hi-Z. The SP-555 also incorporates a loop capture setting, which allows looping samples that one can add to until recording is stopped. A total of 37 built-in effects can be assigned to 16 pressure-sensitive pads. In similarity to the SP-808 installment, the sampler has the D Beam feature, which allows one to control 3 different effects physically, including synth, trigger, and filter. "V-Link" connects the sampler to lighting, allowing light effects to change in sync with the sample or loop. The SP-555 also has several pre-loaded live FX, including Voice Transformer, Delay, Isolator, "Super Filter", and "DJFX Looper". One feature, the Effect Memory, recalls previous settings on the pads without interrupting any sound while switching effects.

Users
 Panda Bear (Noah Lennox) & Geologist (Brian Weitz), Members of experimental pop band Animal Collective
 Kai Campos, member of English electronic music duo Mount Kimbie
 Mndsgn can be seen performing live with the SP-555 in his March 2014 Boiler Room set.
Shabazz Palaces member Palaceer Lazaro uses an SP-555 for the group's NPR Tiny Desk Concert.

See also
 Roland SP-808 
 Roland SP-606
 Roland SP-404

References

Further reading

External links
 https://www.roland.com/global/products/sp-555/
 Roland SP555 Sound On Sound review (archive.org)
 SP-Forums.com - An active forum dedicated to Roland's SP range

Samplers (musical instrument)
SP-555
D-Beam
Workstations
Grooveboxes
Music sequencers
Sound modules
Music workstations
Hip hop production
Japanese inventions